The Agbado River is a river of Benin. It flows through Maxi territory to the north of Abomey. It flows south from its source in northern Collines Department, passes the town of Savalou, and discharges into the Zou River at the Atchérigbé Classified Forest near Setto.

References

Rivers of Benin